An off-season Australian tropical cyclone is a tropical cyclone that existed in the Australian Region, between 90°E and 160°E, outside of the official season. The World Meteorological Organization currently defines the season as occurring between 1 November and 30 April, of the following year, which is when the majority of all tropical cyclones exist. During the off-season, systems are more likely to either develop during or persist until May, with approximately 52% of such storms occurring during that month. Occasionally, however, storms develop in October, with approximately 34% of such storms occurring during that month. As of 2022, there have been 94 tropical cyclones known to have occurred off-season.

Off-season cyclones are most likely to occur in the Coral Sea, with most affecting land in some way. Cumulatively, at least 4 deaths occurred due to the storms, the most recent off-season storm was a Tropical Cyclone 01U in July 2022.

Systems
The wind speeds listed are maximum ten-minute average sustained winds, while the pressure is the minimum barometric pressure, both of which are estimates taken from the archives of either Météo-France, the Australian Bureau of Meteorology, the Fiji Meteorological Service, and New Zealand's MetService. If there are no known estimates of either the winds or pressure then the system is listed as "Not specified" under winds or pressure, if there is no known estimated winds or pressure. For deaths and damages "None" indicates that there were no reports of fatalities, although such storms may have impacted land. The damage totals are the United States dollar of the year of the storm.

|-
| Unnamed ||  || bgcolor=#| || bgcolor=#| || bgcolor=#| || N/A || N/A || N/A ||
|-
| Unnamed ||  || bgcolor=#| || bgcolor=#| || bgcolor=#| || New South Wales ||  ||  ||
|-
| Unnamed ||  || bgcolor=#| || bgcolor=#| || bgcolor=#| || Western Australia, Tasmania ||  ||  ||
|-
| Unnamed ||  || bgcolor=#| || bgcolor=#| || bgcolor=#| || Indonesia || None || None ||
|-
| Unnamed ||  || bgcolor=#| || bgcolor=#| || bgcolor=#| || Queensland, New Zealand || None || None ||
|-
| Unnamed ||  || bgcolor=#| || bgcolor=#| || bgcolor=#| || New Zealand || None || None ||
|-
| Unnamed ||  || bgcolor=#| || bgcolor=#| || bgcolor=#| || Queensland || None || None ||
|-
| Unnamed ||  || bgcolor=#| || bgcolor=#| || bgcolor=#| || Queensland, New Zealand || None || None ||
|-
| Unnamed ||  || bgcolor=#| || bgcolor=#| || bgcolor=#| || Queensland, New Zealand || None || None ||
|-
| Unnamed ||  || bgcolor=#| || bgcolor=#| || bgcolor=#| || Queensland || None || None ||
|-
| Unnamed ||  || bgcolor=#| || bgcolor=#| || bgcolor=#| || Queensland || None || None ||
|-
| 05U ||  || bgcolor=#| || bgcolor=#| || bgcolor=#| || Queensland || None || None ||
|-
| Unnamed ||  || bgcolor=#| || bgcolor=#| || bgcolor=#| || Queensland || None || None ||
|-
| 09U ||  || bgcolor=#| || bgcolor=#| || bgcolor=#| || None || None || None ||
|-
| Unnamed ||  || bgcolor=#| || bgcolor=#| || bgcolor=#| || Queensland || None || None ||
|-
| Unnamed ||  || bgcolor=#| || bgcolor=#| || bgcolor=#| || Queensland || None || None ||
|-
| 06U ||  || bgcolor=#| || bgcolor=#| || bgcolor=#| || None || None || None ||
|-
| Unnamed ||  || bgcolor=#| || bgcolor=#| || bgcolor=#| || Queensland || None || None ||
|-
| 03U ||  || bgcolor=#| || bgcolor=#| || bgcolor=#| || Queensland || None || None ||
|-
| 09U ||  || bgcolor=#| || bgcolor=#| || bgcolor=#| || Queensland || None || None ||
|-
| 01U ||  || bgcolor=#| || bgcolor=#| || bgcolor=#| || None || None || None ||
|-
| 20U ||  || bgcolor=#| || bgcolor=#| || bgcolor=#| || None || None || None || 
|-
| 01U ||  || bgcolor=#| || bgcolor=#| || bgcolor=#| || None || None || None ||
|-
| 02U ||  || bgcolor=#| || bgcolor=#| || bgcolor=#| || None || None || None || 

|-
| 32P ||  || bgcolor=#| || bgcolor=#| || bgcolor=#| || Solomon Islands, New CaledoniaNew Zealand || None || None ||
|-
| 18U ||  || bgcolor=#| || bgcolor=#| || bgcolor=#| || Queensland || None || None ||
|-
| 33P ||  || bgcolor=#| || bgcolor=#| || bgcolor=#| || Queensland || None || None ||
|-
| 24P ||  || bgcolor=#| || bgcolor=#| || bgcolor=#| || Queensland || None || None ||
|-
| 15U ||  || bgcolor=#| || bgcolor=#| || bgcolor=#| || None || None || None ||
|-
| 49P ||  || bgcolor=#| || bgcolor=#| || bgcolor=#| || Solomon Islands, Queensland || None || None ||
|-
| 32U ||  || bgcolor=#| || bgcolor=#| || bgcolor=#| || Solomon Islands, Queensland || None || None ||
|-
| 33U ||  || bgcolor=#| || bgcolor=#| || bgcolor=#| || None || None || None ||
|-
| 34U ||  || bgcolor=#| || bgcolor=#| || bgcolor=#| || None || None || None ||
|-
| 35U ||  || bgcolor=#| || bgcolor=#| || bgcolor=#| || Solomon Islands, VanuatuNew Caledonia || None || None ||
|-
| 53P ||  || bgcolor=#| || bgcolor=#| || bgcolor=#| || New Caledonia || None || None ||
|-
| 37U ||  || bgcolor=#| || bgcolor=#| || bgcolor=#| || New Caledonia || None || None ||
|-
| 38U ||  || bgcolor=#| || bgcolor=#| || bgcolor=#| || New Caledonia || None || None ||
|-
| Esther ||  || bgcolor=#| || bgcolor=#| || bgcolor=#| || Papua New Guinea || None || None ||
|-
| Lulu ||  || bgcolor=#| || bgcolor=#| || bgcolor=#| || Western Australia || None || None ||
|-
| 32P ||  || bgcolor=#| || bgcolor=#| || bgcolor=#| || None || None || None ||
|-
| Hannah ||  || bgcolor=#| || bgcolor=#| || bgcolor=#| || Solomon Islands, Papua New Guinea || None || None ||
|-
| Ida ||  || bgcolor=#| || bgcolor=#| || bgcolor=#| || Solomon Islands, New Caledonia || || ||
|-
| Marcelle ||  || bgcolor=#| || bgcolor=#| || bgcolor=#| || South-Western Australia || None || None ||
|-
| 02P ||  || bgcolor=#| || bgcolor=#| || bgcolor=#| || Queensland || None || None ||
|-
| Marcia ||  || bgcolor=#| || bgcolor=#| || bgcolor=#| || Cocos Island || None || None ||
|-
| Unnamed ||  || bgcolor=#| || bgcolor=#| || bgcolor=#| || None || None || None ||
|-
| Norah ||  || bgcolor=#| || bgcolor=#| || bgcolor=#| || Christmas Island, Cocos Island || None || None ||
|-
| Denise ||  || bgcolor=#| || bgcolor=#| || bgcolor=#| || Cocos Island || Minor || None ||
|-
| Carol ||  || bgcolor=#| || bgcolor=#| || bgcolor=#| || None || None || None ||
|-
| Verna ||  || bgcolor=#| || bgcolor=#| || bgcolor=#| || Northern Territory || None || None ||
|-
| Kevin ||  || bgcolor=#| || bgcolor=#| || bgcolor=#| || None || None || None ||
|-
| Paddy ||  || bgcolor=#|Category 3 severe tropical cyclone ||  bgcolor=#| || bgcolor=#| || Western Australia || None || None ||
|-
| Alex ||  || bgcolor=#|Category 3 severe tropical cyclone ||  bgcolor=#| || bgcolor=#| || None || None || None ||
|-
| Claudia ||  || bgcolor=#| || bgcolor=#| || bgcolor=#| || Solomon Islands || None || None ||
|-
| Naomi ||  || bgcolor=#|Category 3 severe tropical cyclone ||  bgcolor=#| || bgcolor=#| || None || None || None ||
|-
| Oscar ||  || bgcolor=#|Category 3 severe tropical cyclone ||  bgcolor=#| || bgcolor=#| || None || None || None ||
|-
| Billy –Lila ||  || bgcolor=#|Category 4 severe tropical cyclone ||  bgcolor=#| || bgcolor=#| || Western Australia || None || None ||
|-
| Namu ||  || bgcolor=#|Category 3 severe tropical cyclone || bgcolor=#| || bgcolor=#| || Solomon Islands, Vanuatu, New Caledonia || $20 million || 63-150 || 
|-
| Meena ||  || bgcolor=#| || bgcolor=#| || bgcolor=#| || Cape York Peninsula || None || None ||
|-
| Ernie ||  || bgcolor=#| || bgcolor=#| || bgcolor=#| || Vanuatu, Solomon Islands, Papua New Guniea ||  ||  ||
|-
| 02S ||  || bgcolor=#| || bgcolor=#| || bgcolor=#| || None || None || None ||
|-
| Lisa ||  || bgcolor=#| || bgcolor=#| || bgcolor=#| || Solomon Islands, Vanuatu || None || None ||
|-
| Adel ||  || bgcolor=#|Category 3 severe tropical cyclone || bgcolor=#| || bgcolor=#| || Papua New Guinea || Minimal ||  ||
|-
| Willy ||  || bgcolor=#| || bgcolor=#||| bgcolor=#| || Cocos Islands || None || None ||
|-
| Jenna ||  || bgcolor=#| || bgcolor=#| || bgcolor=#|  || None ||  ||  ||
|-
| Unnamed ||  || bgcolor=#| || bgcolor=#| || bgcolor=#|Not specified || Queensland || None || None ||
|-
| Rhonda ||  || bgcolor=#| || bgcolor=#| || bgcolor=#| || Cocos Island, Western Australia || None || None ||
|-
| Lindsay ||  || bgcolor=#| || bgcolor=#| || bgcolor=#| || None ||  ||  ||
|-
| Melanie –Bellamine ||  || bgcolor=#|Category 2 tropical cyclone || bgcolor=#| || bgcolor=#| || None ||  ||  ||
|-
| Zelia ||  || bgcolor=#| || bgcolor=#| || bgcolor=#| || None ||  ||  ||
|-
| 26F ||  || bgcolor=#| || bgcolor=#| || bgcolor=#| || Queensland, New Zealand || || ||
|-
| 20F ||  || bgcolor=#| || bgcolor=#| || bgcolor=#| || Queensland || || ||
|-
| 21F ||  || bgcolor=#| || bgcolor=#| || bgcolor=#| || Queensland || || ||
|-
| Alex – Andre ||  || bgcolor=#| || bgcolor=#| || bgcolor=#| || None || None || None || 
|-
| Errol ||  || bgcolor=#| || bgcolor=#| || bgcolor=#| || None ||  ||  ||
|-
| Upia ||  || bgcolor=#| || bgcolor=#| || bgcolor=#| || Budelun Island ||  ||  ||
|-
| Epi ||  || bgcolor=#| || bgcolor=#| || bgcolor=#| || Papua New Guinea ||  ||  ||
|-
| Phoebe ||  || bgcolor=#|Category 1 tropical cyclone || bgcolor=#| || bgcolor=#| || None ||  ||  ||
|-
| Pierre ||  || bgcolor=#| || bgcolor=#| || bgcolor=#| || Solomon Islands, Papua New GuineaTorres Straits ||  ||  ||
|-
| 01U/01S ||  ||  ||  || None ||  ||  ||
|-
| Kirrily ||  || bgcolor=#| || bgcolor=#| || bgcolor=#| || Indonesia ||   ||  ||
|-
| 24U ||  || bgcolor=#|Tropical low || bgcolor=#| || bgcolor=#| || None || None || None ||
|-
| Anggrek ||  || bgcolor=#|Tropical low || bgcolor=#| || bgcolor=#| || Cocos (Keeling) Islands || None || None ||
|-
| 19S ||  || bgcolor=#| || bgcolor=#| || bgcolor=#| || Indonesia, East Timor || None || None ||
|-
| 21P ||  || bgcolor=#| || bgcolor=#| || bgcolor=#| || None || N/A || None ||
|-
| Zane ||  || bgcolor=#|Category 3 severe tropical cyclone || bgcolor=#| || bgcolor=#| || Papua New Guinea, Queensland || None || None ||
|-
| Quang ||  || bgcolor=#|Category 4 severe tropical cyclone || bgcolor=#| || bgcolor=#| || Western Australia ||  ||  ||
|-
| Raquel ||  || bgcolor=#| || bgcolor=#| || bgcolor=#| || Solomon Islands || Significant || 1 ||
|-
| Frances ||  || bgcolor=#|Category 3 severe tropical cyclone || bgcolor=#| || bgcolor=#| || Papua New Guinea, IndonesiaEast Timor || None || None ||
|-
| Greg ||  || bgcolor=#|Category 1 tropical cyclone ||   ||  || None ||  ||  ||
|-
| Lili ||  || bgcolor=#| || bgcolor=#| || bgcolor=#| || Eastern Indonesia, East Timor, Top End||  ||  ||
|-
| Ann ||  || bgcolor=#|Category 2 tropical cyclone || bgcolor=#| || bgcolor=#| || Solomon Islands, New Caledonia, Queensland || None || None ||
|-
| TD ||  || bgcolor=#|Tropical depression || bgcolor=#| || bgcolor=#| || Western Indonesia, Christmas Island, Cocos Islands || None || None ||
|-
| Mangga ||  || bgcolor=#| || bgcolor=#||| bgcolor=#| || Western Australia ||  ||  ||
|-
| TL ||  || bgcolor=#|Tropical low|| bgcolor=#| || bgcolor=#| || None || None || None ||
|-
| Karim ||  || bgcolor=#|Category 2 tropical cyclone || bgcolor=#| || bgcolor=#| || None ||  ||  ||
|-
| TL ||  || bgcolor=#|Tropical low|| bgcolor=#| || bgcolor=#| || Christmas Island, Western Australia || None || None ||
|-
| 01U ||  || bgcolor=#| || bgcolor=#| || bgcolor=#| || Cocos Islands ||  ||  ||
|}

Records and statistics
The charts below both show during which month a tropical cyclone developed during the off-season. The statistics for April are not complete and only show those systems that formed during the month and either dissipated on 30 April, or persisted into the off-season.

Notes

See also
List of off-season Atlantic hurricanes
List of off-season Pacific hurricanes
List of off-season South Pacific tropical cyclones

References

External links

Off-season Australian region tropical cyclones
Australian region cyclones off-season